The National Assembly of Malawi is the supreme legislative body of the nation. It is situated on Capital Hill, Lilongwe along Presidential Way. The National Assembly alone possesses legislative supremacy and thereby ultimate power over all other political bodies in Malawi. At its head is the Speaker of the House who is elected by his or her peers. Since June 19, 2019 the Speaker is Catherine Gotani Hara.

The 1994 Constitution provided for a Senate but Parliament repealed it. Malawi therefore has a unicameral legislature in practice. The National Assembly has 193 Members of Parliament (MPs) who are directly elected in single-member constituencies using the simple majority (or first-past-the-post) system and serve five-year terms.

Current Parliament
The current parliament was inaugurated in June 2019 after the 2019 Malawian general election. No party managed to secure a majority in the house. Peter Mutharika won the presidential election, however, due to irregularities the constitutional court ordered a re-run of the presidential elections in 2020. Parliament passed the Parliamentary and Presidential Elections Act (PPEA) Amendment Bill on 24 February 2020, extended the terms of MPs and local councillors by one year to allow for harmonised presidential, parliamentary and local elections in 2025.

See also
2007 Malawian political crisis
History of Malawi
List of legislatures by country
List of speakers of the National Assembly of Malawi

Notes

References

External links
 

Politics of Malawi
Malawi
Government of Malawi
Malawi